Ban Zardeh Rural District is a rural district (dehestan) in the Central District of Dalahu County, Kermanshah Province, Iran. At the 2006 census, its population was 6,700, in 1,416 families. The rural district has 15 villages.

References 

Rural Districts of Kermanshah Province
Dalahu County